Mycoplasma hominis is a species of bacteria in the genus Mycoplasma. M.hominis has the ability to penetrate the interior of human cells. Along with ureaplasmas, mycoplasmas are the smallest free-living organisms known.

They have no cell wall and therefore do not Gram stain.

Mycoplasma hominis is associated with pelvic inflammatory disease and bacterial vaginosis. It is also associated with male infertility. This species causes a sexually transmitted disease. It is susceptible to the antibiotic clindamycin.

Growth of "fried egg" colonies on glucose agar medium within 24–48 hours is a characteristic of Mycoplasma hominis.

This pathogen may latently infect the chorionic villi tissues of pregnant women, thereby impacting pregnancy outcome.

Biology and biochemistry

Type and morphology
Mycoplasma hominis is an opportunistic human mycoplasma species residing in the lower urogenital tract. It is a common human urogenital Mycoplasma species that lacks a cell wall. Due to the absence of the cell wall, M. hominis is innately resistant to β-lactams and to all antibiotics which target the cell wall. Additionally, it is the simplest self-replicating microorganism known.  This reaps consequences such as a lack of detection by light microscopy, and complex nutritional requirements. Due to the fact that it does not have a cell wall, Mycoplasma hominis does not gram stain although it is surprisingly often described as gram-negative.

The morphology is quite variable and seems to depend, in part, on the age of the culture as the smallest form observed, coming from the elementary body, is 80mµ to 100mµ wide in diameter. Different cell forms have been observed varying from coccoid cells to filaments and irregularly shaped structures with coccoid forms and ring- or disc-shaped cells reigning predominant. Coccal forms of the species are associated with binary fission while fragmentary filaments, and budding cells were also encountered.  This fact along with the fact that in different labs, the same strains grew at different rates, leads to the conclusion that cultural conditions have influenced the rate of division and cellular morphology in this species.

The internal components of the much larger cells in the species are also variable. These cells can contain different structures such as ribosome-like granules, nuclear areas of netlike strands, dense cytoplasmic bodies and large vacuoles. These observations indicate multiple modes of reproduction for this organism.

Metabolism
Analysis of the M. hominis PG21 genome sequence shows that this organism is the second smallest genome among self-replicating free living organisms. Due to their minimal genomes, M. hominis have reduced metabolic capabilities which are characterized by distinct energy-generating pathways. Three energy pathways that M. hominis is capable of going through is Embden-Meyerhoff-Parnas (EMP), arginine dihydrolase and Riboflavin metabolism.

Culture growth
Cells of M. hominis prepared from batch cultures show uniform exponential growth and appear to divide through the process of binary fission with pleomorphic forms appearing upon further incubation. Similar behavior was demonstrated by another laboratory-adapted strain and by three other clinical isolates, making this seem characteristic of the species. M. hominis grows in a variety of defined laboratory media, such as arginine broth and can also be cultivated in water. Growth in this species, as well as all species of mycoplasmas, is driven by anaerobic respiration.

Role in disease

Site of localization
The primary sites of localization for M. hominis is the oropharynx and the genitourinary tract with positive pathogenicity. It is capable of infecting human beings as well as non-human primates.

Mycoplasma hominis is more than likely implicated in many different diseases, but its role is unclear for most of them. M. hominis is implicated in pelvic inflammatory disease, which may cause ectopic pregnancy. It prospers in the environment created by other gram negative bacteria implicated in bacterial vaginosis and may be a cause of preterm delivery and miscarriage. It is also implicated in postpartum fever, because it may be a cause of endometritis. M. hominis is also suspected to be the cause of neonatal infections such as conjunctivitis, respiratory distress, fever, meningitis, abscesses, and congenital pneumonia. In adults, M. hominis may be implicated in pharyngitis, septicaemia, lung infections, central nervous system infections, other respiratory tract infections, joint infection, and wound infections. M. hominis infections are usually not seen in healthy adults.

Incubation period
The incubation period of M. hominis is unknown.

Treatment
Many antibiotics kill bacteria by weakening those walls but since mycoplasma bacteria don't have them, some antibiotics, like penicillin, won't work against them.

Oral tetracyclines have historically been the drugs of choice for use against urogenital and systemic infections due to M. hominis. In locations and patient populations where tetracycline resistance or treatment failures are common, other drugs such as fluoroquinolones should be considered guided by in vitro susceptibility data when possible.

Some infections may be treated by a single antibiotic. In other cases such as severe M. hominis infections occurring in immunocompromised patients, combination of drugs usually active against the mycoplasmas have been recommended. In those cases, guidelines for optimal therapy remain to be established. Current therapeutic considerations are based only upon case reports.

Prevention
The bacterium is often passed through sex, so to help keep this infection away, safe sex practices should be used.

Genome studies
DNA sequence data is incomplete for M. hominis. M. hominis uses an atypical type of energy metabolism, dependent upon the degradation of arginine. Other mycoplasmas lack this characteristic. Determining the genome will provide information that would facilitate the understanding of metabolic reconstitutions.

See also
 Sexually transmitted disease
 Vaginal infection
 Vaginal disease
 List of bacterial vaginosis microbiota

References

Further reading
 
 
 Pignanelli S, Pulcrano G, Schiavone P, Iula VD, Catania MR. In vitro antimicrobial susceptibility of Mycoplasma hominis genital isolates. Indian J Dermatol Venereol Leprol. 2015 May-Jun;81(3):286-8. doi: 10.4103/0378-6323.153520.

External links
 Ureaplasma Infection: eMedicine Infectious Diseases
 Kenyon College Microbe Wiki for some images of mycoplasmas
 Type strain of Mycoplasma hominis at BacDive -  the Bacterial Diversity Metadatabase

Sexually transmitted diseases and infections
Pathogenic bacteria
Infections with a predominantly sexual mode of transmission
Bacterial vaginosis
Bacteria described in 1955
hominis